"Up'N Away" is a song by German Eurodance group Mr. President. It was the first song ever that received a golden record without charting in the German top ten. And this was also the last single to receive participation from rapper George "Sir Prophet" Jones, as Delroy "Layzee Dee" Rennalls replaced him soon after the release. To avoid confusion after Jones left the group, the song was rerecorded for their debut album, Up'n Away - The Album (1995), with Rennalls providing the lead vocals as he did for the rest of the album's songs. 

In 2000, the song was again remixed and released under the title "Up'N Away 2K" featuring the vocals of Delroy Rennalls, but the remix failed to chart. In 2014, the song was sampled by German dance act ItaloBrothers on the song "Up 'N Away".

Critical reception
Pan-European magazine Music & Media wrote, "This is a bit of an oddity, as it employs virtually all styles currently hip in the dance arena. It could be considered the German answer to the UK's current jungle craze."

Music video
The music video for "Up'n Away" was directed by Hubert Bodner. It features the band's lineup singing and dancing at the Frankfurt Airport, Germany. The video was A-listed on Germany's VIVA in November 1994.

Track listings
 CD maxi - Europe (1994)
 "Up'n Away" (Radio Mix)- 3:52
 "Up'n Away" (Extended Mix) - 5:55
 "Up'n Away" (Club Mix) - 6:33

 CD single, 12" maxi - Remixes (1994)
 "Up'n Away" (Peter's Groove Away Mix)- 5:58
 "Up'n Away" (Peter's Dub Mix) - 7:15

Charts

Weekly charts

Year-end charts

References

1994 singles
1994 songs
English-language German songs
Mr. President (band) songs
Warner Records singles